Alliance for Tanzania Farmers Party (AFP) is a political party in Tanzania.

References

Political parties in Tanzania
Political parties established in 2009
2009 establishments in Tanzania